Bretenoux is a commune in the Lot department in southwestern France.

Geography

Location
The Bastide is located north of the Lot, near the border with the Corrèze department, in the Dordogne Valley, Bretenoux is attached to the town of Biars-sur-Cère. It is watered by the Cère and Le Mamoul rivers, and crossed by the D940 and D803 national roads. Founded in 1277 by the powerful Lord of Castelnau, it has retained its checker-board grid plan, squares and its covered arcades, remains of ramparts, and two beautiful turreted houses, one the town hall, the other the gendarmerie.

Toponymy
Bretenoux comes from the name Brittanorum villa, which means "the domain, the property, of the Breton villa."

Population

Local culture and heritage

Places and monuments
 L'église Sainte-Catherine.
 La place des Consuls: Square in shape, surrounded by houses with arcades and half-timbered houses.
 The house of de l'oncle du Midi, Pierre Loti, on the corner of rue d'Orlinde and rue Pierre-Loti.
 The town hall (mairie) occupies the eastern facade of the old house of the Consuls.
 Château de Castelnau-Bretenoux is located on the neighbouring town of Prudhomat.

Notable persons
 Pierre François de Saint-Priest (1801-1851) is a French politician, born in Bretenoux;
 Louis Auguste Blanqui (1805-1881), a revolutionary, was arrested on March 17, 1871 in Bretenoux while ill, he was resting at a doctor friend's house;
 Adolphe de Lescure (1833-1892), historian and writer, attached to the secretariat of the Ministry of State (1865-1868) and head of the secretaries-writers of the Senate (1875-1892), was born in Bretenoux;
 Pierre Loti (1850-1923), a writer, spent part of his childhood at Bretenoux. He stayed there with his uncle, Pierre Bon, during the summer school holidays from 1861 to 1864. He kept some unforgettable memories that he describes in his latest books as: Le Roman d'un enfant, Prime jeunesse ou Journal intime;
 Eugene Sol (1877-1953), Canon historian of the Lot, died at Bretenoux;
 David Moncoutié (1975-), professional cyclist, lived there.

International relations

Bretenoux is twinned with Glastonbury, United Kingdom.

See also
Communes of the Lot department

References

Communes of Lot (department)